Sukalki is a typical dish from the Basque Country. It is a meat ragú. It is a complete meal that can be eaten by itself due to its high caloric level.

Ingredients 
Sukalki consists of meat, onion, carrot, choricero peppers, peas, potato, broth, oil, and garlic, with salt and sauce to taste.

Cultural Usage 
In Basque cultural celebrations, it is customary to hold cooking competitions, wherein sukalki is often used as the standard meal to be made.

The most important of these competitions is the sukalki competition of Mungia, called Sukalki Eguna.

References 

Meat dishes
Basque cuisine